Selected correspondence of Stanisław Lem has been published in several books.

2018:  Listy i rozmowy (It Only Hurts When I Laugh... Letters and Conversations) is a selected correspondence between Stanisław Lem, the poet Ewa Lipska, and Lem's son, Tomasz Lem, as well as records of conversations between Lem and Lipska in early 2000s.
It includes introduction by Jerzy Jarzębski and comments by Maciej Urbanowski.
2011: Stanisław Lem, Sławomir Mrożek,  (Letters), is a selection of correspondence between Lem and Mrożek from 1956 to 1978.
2002:  (Letters or Resistance of Matter) is a collection of letters written by Stanisław Lem from 1955 to 1988. The book includes brief biographical notes about the addressees and an index of names. The collection contains the author's correspondence with various institutions of the Polish People's Republic and letters written to friends, including: Helena Eilstein, Antoni Słonimski , Wiktor Woroszylski, Jerzy Jarzębski, Daniel Mróz , Szymon Kobyliński, Michael Kandel, and biophysicist prof. Władysław Kapuściński

References

Stanisław Lem